Pickled punks is the carny term for human fetuses preserved in jars of preservative such as formaldehyde, which are used as sideshow attractions. Most pickled punks display some sort of anatomical abnormality, such as conjoined twins or polycephaly; however, the deformities present are as varied as the nature of human afflictions. Fake pickled punks, made from rubber or wax, are known as "bouncers" for their tendency to bounce when dropped on the floor.

History
The practice of preserving and displaying prodigious births is centuries old. In the 17th century, King Frederick III of Denmark had a personal collection of punks numbering in the thousands - a collection started in the 16th century by Frederick II.  And during that same timeframe Ulisse Aldrovandi, an Italian naturalist, had a collection consisting of eighteen thousand various specimens.

The classic pickled punk, floating in a jar of preserving fluid, became most popular during the golden age of sideshows and experienced a great resurgence in the 1950s and 1960s. During that era, many punks were linked to drug abuse, at least in the banner lines outside. Several sideshows featured extensive punk displays – some authentic and others gaffed (faked). Following this era, laws began to restrict the display of punks. To complicate matters, laws differed from state to state, making traveling displays almost impossible. Furthermore, the question of whether punks qualify as "human remains" further complicates the laws.

The great modern showman, Ward Hall, once had one of the largest punk shows in the United States. During one season he was fined because the display of human remains was illegal in the state in which he had set up his show. He replaced his punks with rubber bouncers and continued his tour only to be fined again in another state for being a "conman", displaying "fakes" and "false advertising".

The Stone-Child of Sens
The earliest and most well-documented pedigree for a deformed punk display dates back to 1582 when Mme Colombe Chatri died at the age of sixty-eight, and a twenty-eight-year-old fetus was removed from her womb. The "Stone-Child of Sens" should have been born in 1554; however, labor came and went with no delivery and in the resulting decades the fetus calcified and ossified within the womb, which actually formed a shell. Mme Chatri seemed to have lived a normal life, with the exception of regular abdominal pains.

Following her death and the "delivery" of the Stone-Child, naturalists clamored to claim the fetus and the right to display the tiny marvel. Jean d’Ailleboust wrote a detailed pamphlet in 1582, complete with illustrations, about the case, which became an instant best seller. Ambroise Paré featured the infant in his book Des monstres et prodiges and reveals that the child was sold to M. Prestesiegle, a wealthy merchant in the 1590s. He sold it to a goldsmith named M. Carteron, who in turn sold it in 1628 to M. Bodey, a jewel merchant complete with a sort of "certificate of authenticity". In 1653, the Stone-Child came into the possession of King Frederick III as well as a handwritten copy of the d’Ailleboust paper. By this point, the child was heavily damaged, with both arms broken and the marble-like skin worn off in places.

The Stone-Child remained in the possession of the Royal Museum for decades, cataloged in 1696, 1710, and 1737, and was transferred to the Danish Museum of Natural History in 1826. The Stone-Child went missing sometime in the late 19th century – it is believed that it was literally scrapped by Professor Johan Reinhardt when he was director of the museum as he believed it was not a "scientific display".

The Stone-Child's condition, lithopedion, is fairly rare as only 290 cases exist in modern medical literature. Author Michael Bishop's short story "Within the Walls of Tyre" depicts a fictional contemporary example of the condition.

References

Sources

Sideshow attractions